Stoned Immaculate: The Music of The Doors is a tribute album dedicated to the Doors. Producer Ralph Sall gathered an assortment of artists for the record. Unusually, the surviving members of The Doors played on this tribute record. In addition, recordings of Jim Morrison were used posthumously, in the creation of some of the tracks. In another example of posthumous usage, the cover features a painting by Rick Griffin. The album title is a lyric taken from the song "The WASP (Texas Radio and the Big Beat)."

Track listing
All songs were written by the Doors.

Personnel 
Coordinator [Music] – James Sall
Edited by (digitally) – Stewart Whitmore for Marcussen Mastering Hollywood
Engineer – Eddie Miller
Mastered by – Stephen Marcussen
Mixed by – Eddie Miller, Ralph Sall
Producer, Executive-Producer, Concept – Ralph Sall

References

The Doors tribute albums
2000 compilation albums
Elektra Records compilation albums
Albums with cover art by Rick Griffin
William S. Burroughs albums